The men's 200 metre breaststroke event at the 2010 Asian Games took place on 18 November 2010 at Guangzhou Aoti Aquatics Centre.

There were 20 competitors from 18 countries who took part in this event. Three heats were held, with two containing the maximum number of swimmers (eight). The heat in which a swimmer competed did not formally matter for advancement, as the swimmers with the top eight times from the entire field qualified for the finals.

Naoya Tomita from Japan won the gold medal, Xue Ruipeng from China and Choi Kyu-woong from South Korea were both awarded the silver medal due to reaching in the same time.

Schedule
All times are China Standard Time (UTC+08:00)

Records

Results 
Legend
DSQ — Disqualified

Heats

Final

References
 16th Asian Games Results

External links 
 Men's 200m Breaststroke Heats Official Website
 Men's 200m Breaststroke Ev.No.35 Final Official Website

Swimming at the 2010 Asian Games